The Soviet Union men's national field hockey team represented the Soviet Union in men's international field hockey. The team was controlled by the Federation of bandy and field hockey USSR.

It was one of the dominant national teams during the period of 1980s-1990s from Europe. It won the bronze medal as the host of the 1980 Summer Olympics and reached the semi-finals of World Cup in 1986 where it finished fourth.

Tournament record

Summer Olympics
1980 – 
1988 – 7th place

World Cup
1982 – 6th place
1986 – 4th place
1990 – 6th place

European Championship

1970 – 14th place
1978 – 9th place
1983 – 
1987 – 4th place
1991 – 4th place

Friendship Games
1984 –

Champions Trophy
1982 – 6th place
1987 – 8th place
1988 – 4th place
1990 – 5th place
1991 – 6th place

Sultan Azlan Shah Cup
1991 –

Past squads

1980 Olympic Games

Vladimir Pleshakov
Viacheslav Lampeev
Leonid Pavlovski
Sos Hayrapetyan
Farit Zigangirov
Valeri Belyakov
Sergei Klevtsov
Oleg Zagorodnev
Aleksandr Gusev
Sergei Pleshakov
Mikhail Nichepurenko
Minneula Azizov
Aleksandr Sychyov
Aleksandr Miasnikov
Viktor Deputatov
Aleksandr Goncharov

See also
Russia men's national field hockey team
Soviet Union women's national field hockey team

External links
Soviet Union field hockey team at 1980 Olympics at sports-references

National team
Former national field hockey teams
European men's national field hockey teams
Field hockey